Rachel Marie Wood (born May 10, 1990) is an American soccer player. She played as a midfielder for Boston Breakers.

Career 
Wood graduated from Aliso Niguel High School in 2007. She played for Icelandic club HK/Víkingur before moving to Boston Breakers on July 11, 2014.

Personal life 
She currently is residing in the South End of Boston.

References

External links 
 
 Profile at soccerdonna.de 
 North Carolina profile
 UC Irvine profile

1990 births
Living people
National Women's Soccer League players
American women's soccer players
Boston Breakers players
North Carolina Tar Heels women's soccer players
UC Irvine Anteaters women's soccer players
People from South End, Boston
People from Laguna Niguel, California
Women's association football midfielders